

Newhaven Wildlife Sanctuary, once known as Newhaven station, lies  north-west of Alice Springs at the junction of three distinct bioregions: the Great Sandy Desert, MacDonnell Ranges and Burt Plain in the Northern Territory of Australia.

It was established when Newhaven Station, a pastoral cattle-grazing property in the arid zone of the Northern Territory was purchased by Birds Australia in December 2000 from the then owner, Alex Coppock, in order to conserve its outstanding natural values.  At  in area, Newhaven is five times the size of Birds Australia's other reserve, Gluepot, in South Australia.

Newhaven's landforms include parallel dunes, salt lakes, claypans, plains and rocky hills.  Vegetation includes grasslands, woodlands and shrublands, which can be subdivided into ten distinct vegetation communities, with over 100 species of plants recorded.

Several threatened species of birds and other animals have been recorded on Newhaven.  These include the grey falcon, night parrot, princess parrot, striated grasswren, grey honeyeater, mulgara, black-flanked rock-wallaby, greater bilby, marsupial mole and great desert skink.

Newhaven is surrounded by Aboriginal lands.  People from the Warlpiri, Luritja and Anmatyerre language groups have a traditional association with the area.  Aboriginal sacred sites have been identified on the property.

In December 2005 Birds Australia signed an agreement with the Australian Wildlife Conservancy (AWC) that saw AWC assume ownership and day-to-day financial responsibility for Newhaven, while allowing for Birds Australia to have long-term involvement in the management of the reserve, Birds Australia members to have access, and ensuring the conservation of the flora and fauna.

The construction of the world's longest cat-proof fence was completed at Newhaven in April 2018 enclosing a  predator free area.

Since 2007, it has been located with the locality of Lake Mackay.

See also
 Protected areas of the Northern Territory
Gluepot Reserve

References

Anon. (2006). Birds Australia Annual Report 2005. Birds Australia: Melbourne.

External links

Birds Australia: Newhaven
 Webpage on the Protected Planet website

Nature reserves in the Northern Territory
Australian Wildlife Conservancy reserves
2000 establishments in Australia